Max Adolf Karsten Meyer (born 5 November 1937) was a German competitive sailor and Olympic medalist. He won a bronze medal in the Star class at the 1972 Summer Olympics in Munich, together with Wilhelm Kuhweide.

References

External links
 
 

1937 births
Living people
Sportspeople from Hanover
German male sailors (sport)
Olympic sailors of the United Team of Germany
Olympic sailors of West Germany
Olympic bronze medalists for West Germany
Olympic medalists in sailing
Sailors at the 1960 Summer Olympics – Star
Sailors at the 1964 Summer Olympics – Star
Sailors at the 1972 Summer Olympics – Star
Sailors at the 1976 Summer Olympics – Soling
Medalists at the 1972 Summer Olympics
Star class world champions
World champions in sailing for Germany
European Champions Soling